The 2008–09 Ball State Cardinals men's basketball team was an NCAA Division I college basketball team competing in the Mid-American Conference.

Coaching staff
 Billy Taylor – Head coach
 Joseph Price – Assistant coach
 Bob Simmons – Assistant coach
 Jay Newberry – Assistant coach
 Matt Laur – Director of Basketball Operations

Roster

Walk-on players are italicized.

Schedule

References

Ball State
Ball State Cardinals men's basketball seasons